Corner Stone Cues (CSC) is a label and music production house based in Los Angeles. It is best known for debut release and title song “Requiem for a Tower” featured in the trailer for The Lord of the Rings: The Two Towers. “Requiem for a Tower” is the re-orchestration and arrangement by Daniel J. Nielsen, Simone Benyacar, and Veigar Margeirsson of Clint Mansell’s “Lux Aeterna”, written for the film Requiem for a Dream.

In 2006 CSC collaborated with electro rock band Kinky from Monterrey, Nuevo Leon, Mexico. The 5 song E.P. titled "Sassy" included Kinky's cover of Wall of Voodoo's "Mexican Radio". Kinky later included a remastered version of Mexican Radio on the re-release of Reina. Both Reina and Sassy were originally distributed by Nettwerk.

In 2008 "Eton Path" was released which included the London Studio Orchestra, Purcell Singers, Azam Ali, Dierdre Dubois, Riffat Salamatt, Bryan "Brain" Mantia, Buckethead, and Damian Marley. Eton Path includes adaptations of the Led Zeppelin songs "Ten Years Gone” and "Kashmir". CSC re-orchestrated two movements titled "Ten Years Kashmir Mvt I& II”.

"In Situ" the most recent release, features songs mainly composed by Daniel Law Heath.

There are tentative plans to record a future hybrid orchestral/Epic Music album in the style of "Eton Path".

Company 
Corner Stone Cues was founded in 2006 and is owned by Nathan D. Duvall.
The company is based in Los Angeles, California

Discography

Requiem for a Tower
Requiem for a Tower was released in September 2006. Since them, the "Requiem for a Tower" track was licensed by British broadcasting company Sky Sports as the theme for "Soccer Saturday". Other licensings included Wimbledon, 2006 & 2008 Olympics, 2007 Super Bowl, 2007 Rose Bowl, 2007 NASCAR Championship, and the 2008 & 2009 NBA Finals.

 Requiem for a Tower Mvt II
 Requiem for a Tower Mvt III
 Requiem for a Tower Mvt IV
 Wicked
 J.B.D.
 Betrayal & Redemption
 Threshold
 Shining Path (L.U.2.P)
 Leather Tomb
 Ghost in the Trees
 Azure
 Forrest Chase

Sassy
Sassy, released in September 2006, features music from Kinky. "Mexican Radio" was licensed for the Need for Speed: Undercover in-game soundtrack.

 Freezing Film
 Mexican Radio
 Angry
 Automatic (edit)
 El Patan Natan

Eton Path
Eton Path was released in February 2008 and was recorded at George Martin's AIR Studios in London, with engineering team Nick Wollage and Olga Fitzroy.
"Ten Years Kashmir Mvt II" was placed for use in the following:
 the John Carter trailer
 Top Gear
 So You Think You Can Dance (UK) the Anime Mirai 2013 trailer, and 
 the X-Men: Days of Future Past trailer
"Gloriana" was licensed for the final battle scene in Night at the Museum: Battle of the Smithsonian.

 Sultana
 Madokara Mieru
 Eton Path
 Mojave
 Black Widow
 Demons
 World's End
 Night Terrors
 Saw Blade
 Frigga
 Seraphim
 Laudate
 Gloriana
 Underture
 Ten Years Kashmir Mvt I
 Ten Years Kashmir Mvt II

In Situ
"In Situ" was released on April 17, 2012. 
"Take Down" was licensed as the back-end cue for the Spartacus: War of the Damned'' teaser trailer (which debuted at Comic Con 2012).

 Song of Sorrow
 Dreaming
 In Situ
 Take Down
 Shot
 Thumper
 Panda
 Unsettled
 Old Dominion
 Coffin
 What If
 Lex
 Aston Martin
 Rude Boy
 Flame
 In Situ (Instrumental)
 Lex (Instrumental)

See also 
 Trailer music

References

External links
Official site of Corner Stone Cues
YouTube channel

Music production companies